Dava may refer to:

Dava, a division of Hindu Akhara
Dava (comics), a fictional martial artist appearing in comics published by DC Comics
Dava Bazaar, an area in South Mumbai noted for producing medical and scientific instruments as well as lab chemicals
Dava (Dacian), the Geto-Dacian name for a city, town or fortress
Dava railway station, a former railway station at Dava muir in the Spey Valley, Scotland

People 
Dava Newman, American professor of Aeronautics and Astronautics
Dava Savel, American television producer
Dava Sobel (born 1947), American scientific author
Dava (singer), American pop singer